Nicole Ann Bell (born September 8, 1991), known professionally as Nicole Dollanganger, is a Canadian singer-songwriter and artist.

Dollanganger's music is characterized by a feminine, high-pitched vocal style, minimal instrumentation, and lyrical themes frequently pertaining to true crime, sexuality, and romance. Her music has been described as "lo-fi", "atmospheric", and "bedroom folk", is associated with the folk music, folk pop, bedroom pop, sadcore and dream pop genres. In 2015, Rolling Stone named Dollanganger in an article titled "10 New Artists You Need to Know", stating that her "gothic folk songs" described as "macabre millennial nightmares, softened by dream-pop tranquilizers, reverberating from a casket-shaped music box", are "as beautiful as they are brutal."

Her stage name comes from the Dollanganger Series of novels by V. C. Andrews.

Early life 
Dollanganger was born on September 8, 1991, in Scarborough, a suburban district in Toronto, Ontario. Dollanganger grew up between Whitchurch-Stouffville, Ontario, and southwest Florida, USA. Dollanganger would later go on to cite musicians her father listened to during her childhood, such as American country music singers Bobbie Gentry and Tammy Wynette, as influential on her own musical style.

Career

2010–2014: Career beginnings 
Dollanganger first began writing, producing, and recording music in 2010. She recorded original songs, as well as covers, in her bedroom and bathroom on her MacBook, using the digital audio software GarageBand. In 2011, Dollanganger began posting her music on Tumblr (where she also posted her visual artwork), Myspace, and Bandcamp. Many of the original songs she posted would later be included as tracks on her 2012 debut album, Curdled Milk.

Curdled Milk, written, produced, and recorded entirely by Dollanganger in 2011 and early 2012, was self-released online as her debut album and first record on July 13, 2012. She created the artwork used on the album cover (as well as two alternative album covers, featuring a photograph she took of herself and drew onto.) Shortly after releasing the album, Dollanganger was admitted to a hospital program as she was suffering from anorexia nervosa, anorexia athletica, and bulimia nervosa. (She later revealed that she had been struggling with the disorders while making Curdled Milk.) After being released from the program, she was put on bed rest for a year, during which she dropped out of Ryerson University, where she had been studying film. In a 2014 interview, Dollanganger reflected on how this experience impacted her music and life.

Dollanganger continued creating music and posting her work online. In November 2012 she self-released her second album, Flowers of Flesh and Blood. On February 20, 2013, Dollanganger would release her third album, Ode to Dawn Wiener: Embarrassing Love Songs.

On January 10, 2014, Dollanganger released her fourth album, Observatory Mansions. The title of the nine-track album was adopted from Observatory Mansions, the 2000 debut novel by English novelist Edward Carey. The album was recorded in 2013 and would be the last record Dollanganger would write, produce, and record entirely on her own. Around a month prior the album's release, on December 9, 2013, Dollanganger had posted on social media a tentative track list for an untitled record she was working on — the record would later be revealed to be Observatory Mansions, but the seventh track on the tentative track list, "Hymns for the Small Towns", was not included on the album. "Hymns for the Small Towns" is since unreleased.

Dollanganger hand-made a limited number of physical copies of her first four records (on cassette tape format and CD-R disc format), intending to sell them.

2015–2016: Eerie Organization and Natural Born Losers
in 2015, Dollanganger, alongside Canadian singer and musician Grimes, opened for American singer-songwriter Lana Del Rey at a Toronto concert. Grimes, a fan of Dollanganger's work, later announced that she would be creating her own record label, Eerie Organization, particularly to help release Dollanganger's album Natural Born Losers, stating "It's a crime against humanity for this music not to be heard". In October and November 2015, Dollanganger was a supporting musician in Grimes' Rhinestone Cowgirls Tour.

In March 2016, Dollanganger's song "Chapel" (which would later be included on her 2018 album Heart Shaped Bed, released on Grimes' record label Eerie Organization which had since been renamed Crystal Math Music) was featured in the fourteenth episode of the sixth season of the television series The Walking Dead, "Twice as Far". Later, from August to September 2016, Dollanganger embarked on a co-headlining tour across the United States with bands Elvis Depressedly and Teen Suicide.

2017–2020: Heart Shaped Bed, touring, and collaborations
In February 2017, Dollanganger was the support act for the last leg of Code Orange's Forever tour. In May 2017, she collaborated with grindcore band Full of Hell on the title track of their LP Trumpeting Ecstasy.

In 2018, she announced her upcoming album Heart Shaped Bed. On March 30, she released the first five tracks of the album only on her Bandcamp page. In June, she joined Code Orange for select dates for their The New Reality tour, alongside acts Vein and Twitching Tongues. Later, on October 26, Heart Shaped Bed was properly released and included a newly recorded version of the single "Chapel", produced by Arthur Rizk.

In 2020, she collaborated with musical duo 100 gecs, Craig Owens, and Fall Out Boy on a remix of the 100 Gecs' song "hand crushed by a mallet" for the album 1000 Gecs and The Tree of Clues, a remix album of 1000 Gecs (2019).

2021–present: Married in Mount Airy
In 2021, Dollanganger released a new song "Whispering Glades". In 2022, Dollanganger released 2 new singles titled "Gold Satin Dreamer" and "Runnin' Free", while also announcing that her upcoming seventh studio album was to be released on January 6, 2023. The album is titled 'Married in Mount Airy'.

Discography 
Studio albums
 Curdled Milk (2012)
 Flowers of Flesh and Blood (2012)
 Ode to Dawn Wiener: Embarrassing Love Songs (2013)
 Observatory Mansions (2014)
 Natural Born Losers (2015)
 Heart Shaped Bed (2018)
 Married in Mount Airy (2023)

Extended plays
 Unreleased (2013)
 Columbine (2013)
 BabyLand (2014)
 Greta Gibson Forever (2015)
 Covers (2016)
 Cute Aggression (2017)

Singles
 "My Funeral Boy" (2013)
 "Ode to Danzig" (2013)
 "Christian Woman" (2016)
 "Chapel" (2016)
 "Have You Seen Me?" (2016)
 "Beautiful & Bad" (2016)
 "Observatory Mansions II" (2016)
 "Cute Aggression" (2017)
 "Lemonade" (2018)
 "Whispering Glades" (2021)
 "Gold Satin Dreamer" (2022)
 "Runnin' Free" (2022)

References

External links
 

1991 births
21st-century Canadian women singers
Canadian women singer-songwriters
Living people
Musicians from Toronto
People from Scarborough, Toronto